Bernard "Benda" Hügl (27 March 1908 – 2 April 1982) was a Yugoslav football manager and player who played for Yugoslavia.

He started his career playing with Vrbaški ŠK from where he transferred to Yugoslav giants Građanski Zagreb where he will spend his career.

He managed Ličanin Zagreb, Ferraria, Dinamo Zagreb, Velež Mostar, Proleter Osijek, Yugoslavia B, Stuttgarter Kickers and Heilbronn.

Honours

Manager
Dinamo Zagreb
Yugoslav Cup: 1951

Velež Mostar
Yugoslav Second League: 1954–55

Stuttgarter Kickers
2. Oberliga Süd: 1958–59

References

1908 births
1982 deaths
Yugoslav footballers
Yugoslavia international footballers
Association football defenders
Yugoslav First League players
HŠK Građanski Zagreb players
Croatian football managers
Yugoslav football managers
GNK Dinamo Zagreb managers
Stuttgarter Kickers managers
FK Velež Mostar managers
NK Osijek managers